Footballers' Footballer of the Year Awards are annual association football awards for the best player of the year, best young player of the year and best manager of the year in Bulgarian football. The awards have been presented since the 2001–02 season and the winners are chosen by a vote amongst the members of the Bulgarian football players' union, the Association of Bulgarian footballers (ABF).

Every spring, before the end of the Bulgarian football championship season, a shortlist of nominees is prepared by the ABF in consultation with football journalists, players and managers. Then, in April, each professional footballer playing in the top two divisions of Bulgarian football (the Bulgarian A Professional Football Group and the Bulgarian B Professional Football Group), no matter of his nationality, votes for a total of three players, three young players and three managers from the shortlist. The awards are given to the professionals who have received most of the votes. The awards winners are announced at a gala event after the end of the football championship season.

Winners
The awards have been presented since 2001. The following tables present all the winners, runners-up and third-placed players and managers.

Player of the year

Young player of the year

Manager of the year

Women's player of the year
The women's player of the year award has been presented since 2016.

References

Footballers in Bulgaria
Player of the Season (football)
2002 establishments in Bulgaria
Awards established in 2002
Annual events in Bulgaria
Association football player non-biographical articles